Michel Caillaud (born 10 April 1957) is a French chess problemist.

In 1993, Caillaud gained the title Grandmaster of the FIDE for Chess Compositions. At 36 years of age, he was the youngest GM for Chess Compositions. He has 200.92 points in FIDE Albums.

Caillaud twice won the World Chess Solving Championship: 1987 in Graz and 2000 in Pula. In 2002, he gained the title International Solving Grandmaster.

Examples

Solutions

Proof game: 1.b4 h5 2.b5 Rh6 3.b6 Rc6 4.bxc7 Rxc2 5.cxb8=Q Rxd2 6.Qd6 Rxd1+ 7.Qxd1 or 1.b4 h5 2.b5 Rh6 3.b6 Rd6 4.bxc7 Rxd2 5.cxb8=B Rxc2 6.Bf4 Rxc1 7.Bxc1. This is the so-called Pronkin theme.

Second example:1.Nf3 Nc6 2.Ne5 Nxe5 3.Nxd7 Nb8.

Notes

External links
 Problems at the PDB-Server
 https://web.archive.org/web/20110716080855/http://www.sitesled.com/members/wccc/album/solving/slides/13.html

Living people
French chess players
1957 births
International Judges of Chess Compositions
Chess composers
Grandmasters for chess composition
International solving grandmasters
Chess double grandmasters